KKYN-FM is a radio station licensed to Plainview, Texas, broadcasting on 106.9 MHz. The station airs a country music format, and is owned by Monte Spearman and Gentry Todd Spearman, through licensee High Plains Radio Network, LLC.

References

External links
High Plains Network Texas 

KYN-FM
Country radio stations in the United States